Big Springs Creek is a  long third-order tributary to South Branch Verdigre Creek in Antelope County, Nebraska.

Course
Big Springs Creek rises on the Elkhorn River divide about 1.5 miles [CONVERT] west of Orchard, Nebraska in Antelope County and then flows north and northeast to join South Branch Verdigre Creek about 5 miles [CONVERT] north-northeast of Orchard, Nebraska.

Watershed
Big Springs Creek drains  of area, receives about 26.1 in/year [CONVERT] of precipitation, has a wetness index of 539.52, and is about 2.32% forested.

See also

List of rivers of Nebraska

References

Rivers of Antelope County, Nebraska
Rivers of Nebraska